The 2019 NCAA Division I FBS football season was the highest level of college football competition in the United States organized by the National Collegiate Athletic Association (NCAA) in 2019. The regular season began on August 24, 2019, and ended on December 14, 2019. The postseason concluded on January 13, 2020, with the 2020 College Football Playoff National Championship at the Mercedes-Benz Superdome in New Orleans. The LSU Tigers defeated the defending champion Clemson Tigers by a score of 42–25 to claim their first national championship in the College Football Playoff (CFP) era, and fourth overall. It was the sixth season of the College Football Playoff (CFP) system.

November 6, 2019, marked the 150th anniversary of what is traditionally considered the first college football game, played between Princeton and Rutgers in 1869. Various sports media, the NCAA, and the CFP honored the 150th anniversary of the sport throughout the season. Because there were no games played during the 1871 season, this was also the 150th season of college football.

Conference realignment

Membership changes
Liberty completed a two-year transition from the FCS to the FBS in 2018 and became fully bowl-eligible starting with the 2019 season. It remained an NCAA Division I FBS Independent.

Rule changes
The following playing rule changes have been approved by the NCAA Playing Rules Oversight Panel for 2019:

 Requiring replay reviews on targeting calls be either confirmed or overturned by reviewing all aspects of the play.  If the review cannot confirm that all elements of targeting exist, the targeting call will be overturned. "Stands" is no longer a valid option for replay reviews on targeting fouls.
 Players who commit three or more targeting penalties in the same season will receive a one-game suspension in addition to any ejection penalties.
 Eliminating the two-man wedge on kickoffs, except when the kicking team is in an obvious onside kick formation or if the kick results in a touchback, fair catch, or goes out of bounds in the field of play.
 Starting with the fifth overtime period, each team will line up at the three-yard line to attempt a two point conversion instead of snapping the ball from the 25 yard line.  The first game using this new procedure was on October 19, 2019, between the North Carolina Tar Heels and the Virginia Tech Hokies which went to six overtimes before Virginia Tech won 43–41.
Adding a two-minute break after the second and fourth overtime period.
Blindside blocks delivered with forcible contact will draw a 15-yard penalty (personal foul).  If elements of targeting exist, the player delivering the block will be subject to ejection (and suspension if it's the third targeting foul in the season) as with any other targeting foul.

Other headlines
January 31 – The NCAA Division I Committee on Infractions banned SEC school Missouri's football, baseball and softball teams from competing in the postseason for the 2019 season and placed the athletics department on 3 years of probation. The penalties were handed down after a 2 year investigation into alleged academic fraud, conducted by the University of Missouri and initiated by former Missouri tutor Yolanda Kumar's allegations in November 2016 that she improperly assisted 42 student-athletes. She claimed she was groomed by her superiors to commit "academic dishonesty" and alleged that she completed online courses and took final exams for Missouri men's basketball and football players. The NCAA Division I Committee on Infractions found that Kumar violated NCAA ethical conduct, academic misconduct and academic extra benefits rules when she completed academic work for 12 student-athletes. The NCAA's report did not find evidence that her colleagues directed her to complete the athletes' work. Kumar was given a 10-year show-cause order, in which any NCAA member attempting to hire her must restrict her from any athletic-related duties. The football, baseball and softball programs will have a 5 percent reduction in scholarships and a 12.5 percent reduction in official visits and evaluation days for the 2019–20 academic year. Further, these sports will face a 7 week ban on unofficial visits, recruiting communications, and off-campus recruiting evaluation days. Finally, the NCAA fined Missouri $5,000, plus 1 percent of each of its budgets in football, baseball and softball.  Missouri athletic director Jim Sterk issued a statement saying the school will file an appeal.
February 8 – Ohio State Athletic Director Gene Smith announced that he is stepping down from the CFP selection committee in order to focus on helping head coach Ryan Day.  He will be replaced by Iowa athletic director Gary Barta.
February 12 – Ole Miss Athletic Director Ross Bjork announced that Ole Miss will vacate 33 victories from their football program between the seasons of 2010 and 2016 due to fielding ineligible players.  The Rebels will vacate four wins from 2010, two from 2011, seven from 2012, seven from 2013, eight from 2014 and five from 2016, to include a victory over Alabama in 2014.  The vacated wins stem from an investigation into the Ole Miss football program involving academic, booster and recruiting misconduct, and a lack of institutional control.  Ole Miss had already served a two-year postseason ban in 2017 and 2018 and was given three years of probation, through 2020, as well as scholarship reductions and recruiting restrictions in sanctions handed down more than a year ago.
March 9 – U.S. District Judge Claudia Ann Wilken ruled against the NCAA in an antitrust lawsuit, saying football and basketball players should be permitted to receive more compensation from schools but only if the benefits are tied to education.  Her ruling said the NCAA cannot "limit compensation or benefits related to education."  The claim was originally brought forward by West Virginia football player Shawne Alston, and later merged with other lawsuits, including one brought forward by Clemson player Martin Jenkins.  Judge Wilken had previously ruled against the NCAA in the O'Bannon v. NCAA lawsuit brought against the NCAA by former UCLA player Ed O'Bannon.
May 13 – The Orange Bowl was rescheduled for December 30, 2019, after initially being scheduled on New Year's Day, 2020.  The adjustment was made to allow the 2019 Orange Bowl to maintain its status as a prime-time event.  Had it remained on New Year's Day, it would have been scheduled to play in the afternoon, rather than at night.  It is not a College Football Playoff Semifinal game this season.
June 4 – The Big Ten and SEC announced changes to its bowl tie-ins for the 2020 season through 2025. The two conferences joined the Belk Bowl and Las Vegas Bowl in alternating years; the Big Ten will play the Las Vegas Bowl in odd-numbered years, and the SEC in even-numbered years, both against a Pac-12 opponent. This move acts to heighten the profile of the game, as it plans to move to Allegiant Stadium (future home of the NFL's Oakland Raiders) in 2020. The conference not playing the Las Vegas bowl will play an ACC opponent at the Belk Bowl. The Big Ten will also gain a tie-in for the Cheez-It Bowl. In return, the Big Ten will drop the Gator Bowl and Holiday Bowl.
June 27 – The Big East Conference, following a vote of approval by the presidents of the conference's current members, announced that the University of Connecticut will be joining the Big East in academic year 2020–21.  Thus, the 2019 season will be UConn's last in the American Athletic Conference.  UConn had not yet determined which conference their football team will play in, as the AAC will not allow UConn to remain as a football-only member and the Big East does not currently sponsor football.  UConn was a charter member of the original Big East when it formed in 1979. The original conference split along football lines in 2013, with three football-sponsoring schools departing for the Atlantic Coast Conference, the seven schools without FBS football leaving to form a new Big East Conference, and the remaining FBS schools joining with several new members to reorganize the original Big East corporate entity as The American. All three members of the current Big East that sponsor football play that sport in FCS conferences.
 July 26 – Multiple media reports indicated that UConn and The American had reached a buyout agreement that cemented July 2020 as UConn's exit date. The fee was reportedly $17 million. UConn also announced that its football team would become an FBS independent.
 August 19 & 20 – Arkansas State announced that head coach Blake Anderson had taken a leave of absence while his wife Wendy was dealing with a second bout with breast cancer. The following day, the coach posted on Twitter that his wife had died. During Anderson's bereavement leave, Red Wolves defensive coordinator David Duggan served as interim head coach. Anderson returned to the sidelines for the Red Wolves' September 7 game at UNLV.
 September 21 – Pitt defeated UCF 35–34 ending the Knights 25-game regular-season winning streak in a game known as the "Pitt Special"
September 30 – California governor Gavin Newsom signed the Fair Pay to Play Act into law, which upon taking effect in 2023 will prohibit public colleges and universities in the state from punishing their athletes for earning endorsement income. The bill places the state in direct conflict with the NCAA's current rules, which prohibits college athletes from receiving such income. At the time the bill was signed, several other states were proposing similar laws.
 October 19 – Illinois upset Wisconsin 24–23 on a last-second field goal. The 30 1/2 point underdog's win was the biggest upset in Big Ten football since Northwestern's win over Minnesota in 1982 as a 32 point underdog. This was Illinois's first win over a ranked opponent since defeating Arizona State in 2011. Also in this game, Wisconsin running back Jonathan Taylor became the 4th player in FBS football history to reach 5,000 career rushing yards during his junior season (including bowl games), joining former Georgia running back Herschel Walker, former Wisconsin running back Ron Dayne, and former Oregon running back LaMichael James. Taylor reached this milestone in 736 career rushes, fewer than the previous quickest to this milestone (James in 755 career rushes).
 October 27 – LSU edged Alabama and Ohio State in one of the closest AP Poll votes ever. LSU received 1,476 points and 17 first-place votes from the voters, while Alabama received 1,474 points and 21 first-place votes and Ohio State received 1,468 points and 17 first-place votes. This 8-point margin between 1st and 3rd was the fewest since the current ranking system was remade in 1978.
 October 29 – The NCAA board of governors voted unanimously to begin the process of changing institutional rules so that college athletes can profit from their names, images, and likenesses, while still maintaining a distinction between college and professional sports. The proposal calls for each of the three NCAA divisions to draft new rules consistent with this mandate, with a target date of January 2021.
November 5 — The first College Football Playoff committee rankings were released. The committee ranked Ohio State at No. 1, after the November 3 AP Poll ranked LSU at No. 1 and the November 3 Coaches Poll ranked Alabama at No. 1. This resulted in all three major college football selectors splitting on the number one team for the first time in the CFP era.

Stadiums

Updated
Appalachian State is currently rebuilding the north end zone of Kidd Brewer Stadium. The $45 million upgrade began with the demolition of Owens Field House, and will feature an accommodation of a wide variety of athletics and academic uses and will add around 1,000 seats to the stadium. The project is expected to be completed in time for the start of the 2020 season.
Iowa is rebuilding the north end zone of Kinnick Stadium. The $89.9 million upgrade will feature the addition of box seating, outdoor club seating, and a new scoreboard. The entire project is nearing completion and is expected to be finished in time for the Hawkeyes' 2019 home opener.
Liberty is expanding the Arthur L. Williams Football Operations Center at Williams Stadium; additions to the east and west sides of the building will bring the center to about 75,000 square feet. Construction is expected to be completed in time for the 2020 season.
Missouri is rebuilding the south end zone of Faurot Field. The $98 million upgrade will feature new suites, club seats and a 750-person membership only field-level club, an expanded video scoreboard, as well as a new football facility with state-of-the-art training rooms, offices, and home and away dressing rooms. Construction is expected to be completed in time for the 2019 season.
Old Dominion is currently rebuilding the east and west grandstands of Ballard Stadium. The $24.8 million upgrade began with demolition of the old grandstands immediately after the Monarchs' last 2018 home game, with reconstruction expected to be completed in time for ODU's 2019 home opener.
 Syracuse began a $118 million, two-phase renovation of the Carrier Dome during the summer of 2019. The centerpiece of the first phase, planned to be completed in time for the 2020 football season, will see the Dome's inflatable roof replaced by a new fixed, semi-translucent roof. Other improvements in this phase include a new scoreboard that can be moved to optimal positions for football or basketball, Wi-Fi improvements, new sound and lighting systems, and accessibility upgrades. The second phase, to be completed in 2022, will see the installation of air conditioning, new concessions space, and further accessibility upgrades.
Coastal Carolina has completed the expansion of Brooks Stadium, adding an Upper Deck and Suites to the west grandstands.  This expansion brings the seating capacity to 20,000.

Renamed
 Rutgers renamed their stadium to SHI Stadium as part of a new naming rights agreement with New Jersey-based IT firm SHI International Corp.

Related news 
 While the stadium was not renamed, Louisville announced on October 24, 2019 that it had settled a naming rights dispute with Papa John's Pizza founder John Schnatter regarding Cardinal Stadium. The company's name had been stripped from the stadium in 2018 amid controversy over the use of a racial slur by Schnatter. Unlike most naming rights deals, the Cardinal Stadium contract was with Schnatter personally and not Papa John's, and gave him almost unlimited power to change the stadium name. The settlement calls for the Louisville athletic department to pay Schnatter $9.5 million over 5 years in exchange for his release of naming rights.

Upcoming
 The 2019 season was the last for South Alabama at its current home of Ladd–Peebles Stadium. The school began construction of the new on-campus Hancock Whitney Stadium in 2018, and plans to open the 25,000-seat facility in time for the 2020 season.
 The Birmingham–Jefferson Civic Center Authority began construction on UAB's new home of Protective Stadium on the grounds of the Birmingham–Jefferson Convention Complex on July 25, 2019. The new venue, seating slightly over 45,000, is planned to open in 2021.
 The 2019 season was expected to be the last for UNLV at its current off-campus home of Sam Boyd Stadium. For 2020 and beyond, the Rebels will move to the new Allegiant Stadium, also off-campus but much closer to the school, alongside the stadium's primary tenant, the relocated Las Vegas Raiders of the NFL.

Kickoff games
Rankings reflect the AP Poll entering each week.

"Week Zero"
The regular season began with two Week 0 games on Saturday, August 24:
Camping World Kickoff (Camping World Stadium, Orlando): No. 8 Florida defeated Miami (FL), 24–20
Hawaii defeated Arizona, 45–38

Week 1
The majority of FBS teams opened the season on Labor Day weekend. Three neutral-site "kickoff" games were held.

Belk College Kickoff Game (Bank of America Stadium, Charlotte): North Carolina defeated South Carolina, 24–20
Advocare Classic (AT&T Stadium, Arlington): No. 16 Auburn defeated No. 11 Oregon, 27–21
Chick-fil-A Kickoff Game (Mercedes-Benz Stadium, Atlanta): No. 2 Alabama defeated Duke, 42–3

Week 3
An additional "kickoff game" was held on Friday, September 13.

Texas Kickoff (NRG Stadium, Houston): No. 20 Washington State defeated Houston, 31–24

Regular season top 10 matchups
Rankings reflect the AP Poll. Rankings for Week 11 and beyond will list College Football Playoff Rankings first and AP Poll second. Teams that fail to be a top 10 team for one poll or the other will be noted.
Week 2
No. 6 LSU defeated No. 9 Texas 45–38 (Darrell K Royal–Texas Memorial Stadium, Austin, Texas)
Week 4
No. 3 Georgia defeated No. 7 Notre Dame 23–17 (Sanford Stadium, Athens, Georgia)
Week 6
No. 10 Florida defeated No. 7 Auburn 24–13 (Ben Hill Griffin Stadium, Gainesville, Florida)
Week 7
No. 5 LSU defeated No. 7 Florida 42–28 (Tiger Stadium, Baton Rouge, Louisiana)
Week 9
No. 2 LSU defeated No. 9 Auburn 23–20 (Tiger Stadium, Baton Rouge, Louisiana)
Week 10
No. 8 Georgia defeated No. 6 Florida 24–17 (TIAA Bank Field, Jacksonville, Florida)
Week 11
No. 2/1 LSU defeated No. 3/2 Alabama 46–41 (Bryant–Denny Stadium, Tuscaloosa, Alabama)
Week 13
No. 2/2 Ohio State defeated No. 8/9 Penn State 28–17 (Ohio Stadium, Columbus, Ohio)
Week 14
No. 1/2 Ohio State defeated No. 13/10 Michigan 56–27 (Michigan Stadium, Ann Arbor, Michigan) 
Week 15
 No. 6/6 Oklahoma defeated No. 7/8 Baylor 30–23, OT (2019 Big 12 Championship Game, AT&T Stadium, Arlington, Texas)
 No. 2/1 LSU defeated No. 4/4 Georgia 37–10 (2019 SEC Championship Game, Mercedes-Benz Stadium, Atlanta, Georgia)
 No. 1/2 Ohio State defeated No. 8/10 Wisconsin 34–21 (2019 Big Ten Football Championship Game, Lucas Oil Stadium, Indianapolis, Indiana)

Upsets 
During the college football regular season, 36 unranked teams defeated a ranked opponent. The highest ranked teams that lost to an unranked opponent were No. 3 Georgia in week 7, No. 6 Wisconsin in week 8, No. 5 Oklahoma in week 9, and No. 6 Oregon in week 13.

No. 3 Georgia (−20.5) falls to South Carolina in 2OT

On October 12, No. 3 Georgia Bulldogs (5–0, 2–0) played a home conference game against the South Carolina Gamecocks (2–3, 1–2). The Bulldogs, who had won five straight against the Gamecocks, were favored by 20.5 points. Though Georgia outgained South Carolina by more than 170 yards, they had four turnovers to South Carolina's none. Tied at 17, the game went to overtime, where, after Georgia failed to score on its possession, South Carolina had a chance to kick a game-winning 33-yard field goal. However, they missed it and the game went to a second overtime where South Carolina converted on a 24-yard field goal and Georgia missed a 42-yard field goal.

No. 6 Wisconsin (−30.5) defeated by Illinois on last second field goal

On October 19, No. 6 Wisconsin Badgers (6–0, 3–0) was heavily favored, by 30.5 points, against their conference rivals Illinois Fighting Illini (2–4, 0–2). The game was played at Illinois' stadium in Champaign, Illinois. Wisconsin led the entire game until a last second field goal was made by Illinois to give them a 24–23 win. Wisconsin turned over the ball on their last two drives which allowed Illinois to score twice in the last six minutes of the game. The Badgers had previously defeated the Fighting Illini in nine consecutive match-ups.

No. 5 Oklahoma's rally falls short against Kansas State (+23.5) after onside kick recovery overturned

On October 26, No. 5 Oklahoma Sooners (7–0, 4–0) traveled to the Kansas State Wildcats (4–2, 1–2) for a conference game. The Sooners were favored by 23.5 points and led 17–7 after the 1st quarter. However, Kansas State built a large 48–23 lead by scoring on 8 consecutive possessions, including scoring on each possession in the 2nd and 3rd quarters, after punting on its first possession of the game. In the 4th quarter, Oklahoma scored 18 consecutive points to cut the Kansas State lead to 48–41. After Oklahoma attempted an onside kick and appeared to recover it, the recovery was overturned due to an Oklahoma player touching the football prior to the ball traveling the required 10 yards. Kansas State was awarded possession of the ball and ran out the clock to preserve the Wildcats' first win over a top 5 team since 2006 and their first home win over Oklahoma since 1996.

No. 6 Oregon (−13.5) loses at Arizona State

On November 23, No. 6 Oregon Ducks (9–1, 7–0) traveled to the Arizona State Sun Devils (5–5, 2–5) for a conference game. The Ducks were favored by 13.5 points, but were behind at halftime 10–7. Arizona State stretched its lead to 24–7 with less than 9 minutes left in the 4th quarter, before 4 combined touchdowns scored in the final minutes allowed the Sun Devils to escape with a 31–28 victory.

Conference standings

Conference summaries

CFP College Football Playoff participant

Postseason

Bowl selections

There were 39 team-competitive post-season bowl games, with two teams advancing to a 40th – the CFP National Championship game. Normally, a team is required to have a .500 minimum winning percentage during the regular season to become bowl-eligible (six wins for an 11- or 12-game schedule, and seven wins for a 13-game schedule). If there are not enough winning teams to fulfill all open bowl slots, teams with losing records may be chosen to fill all 78 bowl slots. Additionally, on the rare occasion in which a conference champion does not meet eligibility requirements, they are usually still chosen for bowl games via tie-ins for their conference.

Bowl-eligible teams
ACC (10): Boston College, Clemson, Florida State, Louisville, Miami (FL), North Carolina, Pittsburgh, Virginia, Virginia Tech, Wake Forest
American (7): Cincinnati, Memphis, Navy, SMU, Temple, Tulane, UCF
Big Ten (9): Illinois, Indiana, Iowa, Michigan, Michigan State, Minnesota, Ohio State, Penn State, Wisconsin
Big 12 (6): Baylor, Iowa State, Kansas State, Oklahoma, Oklahoma State, Texas
C-USA (8): Charlotte, Florida Atlantic, FIU, Louisiana Tech, Marshall, Southern Miss, UAB, Western Kentucky
MAC (8): Buffalo, Central Michigan, Eastern Michigan, Kent State, Miami (OH), Ohio, Toledo*, Western Michigan
Mountain West (7): Air Force, Boise State, Hawaii, Nevada, San Diego State, Utah State, Wyoming
Pac-12 (7): Arizona State, California, Oregon, USC, Utah, Washington, Washington State
SEC (9): Alabama, Auburn, Florida, Georgia, Kentucky, LSU, Mississippi State, Tennessee, Texas A&M
Sun Belt (5): Appalachian State, Arkansas State, Georgia Southern, Georgia State, Louisiana
Independent (3): BYU, Liberty, Notre Dame
Number of bowl berths available: 78Number of bowl-eligible teams: 79

Bowl-eligible teams that were not invited
MAC (1): Toledo (6–6)

Bowl-ineligible teams
ACC (4): Duke, Georgia Tech, NC State, Syracuse
American (5): East Carolina, Houston, South Florida, Tulsa, UConn
Big Ten (5): Maryland, Nebraska, Northwestern, Purdue, Rutgers
Big 12 (4): Kansas, TCU, Texas Tech, West Virginia
C-USA (6): Middle Tennessee, North Texas, Old Dominion, Rice, UTEP, UTSA
MAC (4): Akron, Ball State, Bowling Green, Northern Illinois
Mountain West (5): Colorado State, Fresno State, New Mexico, San Jose State, UNLV
Pac-12 (5): Arizona, Colorado, Oregon State, Stanford, UCLA
SEC (5): Arkansas, Missouri, Ole Miss, South Carolina, Vanderbilt
Sun Belt (5): Coastal Carolina, Louisiana-Monroe, South Alabama, Texas State, Troy
Independent (3): Army, New Mexico State, UMass

Number of bowl-ineligible teams: 51

College Football Playoff

Conference performance in bowl games

Awards and honors

Heisman Trophy
The Heisman Trophy is given to the year's most outstanding player.

 Joe Burrow, QB, LSU
 Jalen Hurts, QB, Oklahoma
 Justin Fields, QB, Ohio State
 Chase Young, DE, Ohio State

Other overall
 AP Player of the Year: Joe Burrow, QB, LSU
 Lombardi Award (top player): Joe Burrow, QB, LSU
 Maxwell Award (top player): Joe Burrow, QB, LSU
 SN Player of the Year: Joe Burrow, LSU
 Walter Camp Award (top player): Joe Burrow, QB, LSU

Special overall
 Burlsworth Trophy (top player who began as walk-on): Kenny Willekes, DE, Michigan State
 Paul Hornung Award (most versatile player): Lynn Bowden Jr., WR/RS/QB, Kentucky
 Jon Cornish Trophy (top Canadian player): Chuba Hubbard, RB, Oklahoma State
 Campbell Trophy ("academic Heisman"): Justin Herbert, QB, Oregon
 Wuerffel Trophy (humanitarian-athlete): Jon Wassink, QB, Western Michigan
 Senior CLASS Award (senior student-athlete): Derrick Brown, DT, Auburn

Offense
Quarterback

 Davey O'Brien Award: Joe Burrow, LSU
 Johnny Unitas Golden Arm Award (senior/4th year quarterback): Joe Burrow, LSU
 Manning Award: Joe Burrow, LSU
 Sammy Baugh Trophy (passing quarterback):

Running back

 Doak Walker Award: Jonathan Taylor, Wisconsin

Wide receiver

 Fred Biletnikoff Award: Ja'Marr Chase, LSU

Tight end

 John Mackey Award: Harrison Bryant, Florida Atlantic

Lineman:

 Rimington Trophy (center): Tyler Biadasz, Wisconsin
Outland Trophy (interior lineman on either offense or defense): Penei Sewell, OL, Oregon
 Joe Moore Award (offensive line): LSU

Defense
 Bronko Nagurski Trophy (defensive player): Chase Young, DE, Ohio State
 Chuck Bednarik Award (defensive player): Chase Young, DE, Ohio State
 Lott Trophy (defensive impact): Derrick Brown, DT, Auburn

Defensive front

 Bill Willis Award (defensive lineman):
 Dick Butkus Award (linebacker): Isaiah Simmons, Clemson
 Jack Lambert Trophy (linebacker): 
 Ted Hendricks Award (defensive end): Chase Young, Ohio State

Defensive back

Paycom Jim Thorpe Award: Grant Delpit, S, LSU 
Jack Tatum Trophy:

Special teams
 Lou Groza Award (placekicker): Rodrigo Blankenship, Georgia 
 Ray Guy Award (punter): Max Duffy, Kentucky
 Jet Award (return specialist): Joe Reed, Virginia
 Peter Mortell Award (holder): Preston Brady, Memphis
 Patrick Mannelly Award (holder): John Shannon, Notre Dame

Coaches
 AFCA Coach of the Year: Ed Orgeron, LSU
 AP Coach of the Year: Ed Orgeron, LSU
 Bobby Dodd Coach of the Year: Kyle Whittingham, Utah 
 Eddie Robinson Coach of the Year: Ed Orgeron, LSU
 George Munger Collegiate Coach of the Year: Ed Orgeron, LSU
 Home Depot Coach of the Year: Ed Orgeron, LSU
 Paul "Bear" Bryant Award: Ed Orgeron, LSU
 Sporting News Coach of the Year: 
 Walter Camp Coach of the Year: Ed Orgeron, LSU

Assistants
 AFCA Assistant Coach of the Year: Mike Viti, FB, Army
 Broyles Award: Joe Brady, WR/passing game, LSU

All-Americans

Rankings

CFB Playoff final rankings

On December 8, 2019, the College Football Playoff selection committee announced its final team rankings for the year.

Coaching changes

Preseason and in-season
This is restricted to coaching changes taking place on or after May 1, 2019, and includes any changes announced after a team's last regularly scheduled game but before its bowl game. For coaching changes that occurred earlier in 2019, see 2018 NCAA Division I FBS end-of-season coaching changes.

End of season
This list includes coaching changes announced during the season that did not take effect until the end of the season.

Television viewers and ratings

Most watched regular season games

Conference championship games

Most watched non-CFP bowl games

College Football Playoff

See also

2019 NCAA Division I FCS football season
2019 NCAA Division II football season
2019 NCAA Division III football season
2019 NAIA football season

Notes

References